Roberto Fico (born 10 October 1974) is an Italian politician. He is a member of the Five Star Movement, and has been serving as President of the Italian Chamber of Deputies from 2018 to 2022. Previously, he was the Chairman of the RAI Supervision Commission from 2013 to 2018.

Early life
Fico was born in Naples in 1974 to a middle-class family. He studied communication studies at the University of Trieste and did an Erasmus exchange at the University of Helsinki, graduating in 2001 with a thesis regarding the social and linguistic identity of Neapolitan neomelodic music. After the university he worked for some press offices, in a hotel, as tour operator manager, in a call-center, in a butcher's shop, and as a small importer of fabrics from Morocco.

Political career
On 18 July 2005 he founded in Naples one of the forty "Friends of Beppe Grillo" meetups, in the wake of which the Five Star Movement was born. In 2010 he ran as President of Campania region, but only received 1.35% of the votes in the election. In 2011 he was the M5S candidate for Mayor of Naples, getting only 1.38% of votes, not exceeding the first round.

In December 2012 Fico arrived first, with 228 preferences obtained on the web, in the parliamentary primary election of the M5S, and thus he was nominated for the first position on the M5S list of the constituency Campania 1. In February 2013, he was elected to the 17th Italian Parliament.

In 2013, Fico was voted by his parliamentary group to the Presidency of the Chamber of Deputies without being elected. On 6 June 2013 he was elected Chairman of the RAI Supervision Commission. Fico has renounced the function allowance to which he would have been entitled as Chairman of the RAI Supervision Commission and the personal car. As president of the RAI Supervision Commission, during his presidency, he introduced the live streaming broadcast on the web TV of the Chamber of Deputies of all the auditions, the publication on the Parliament website of the questions addressed by the commissioners to RAI and the related answers and the determination of a maximum of 15 days for the answers to the questions by the public radio and television company. Among the acts approved in the Commission, there was a resolution aimed at resolving and avoiding possible conflicts of interest.

As a deputy, he also presented a draft law on the governance of RAI; one of the points, the plan for corporate transparency, has merged into the RAI reform approved in 2015 by the Parliament. Following the implementation of this plan, the company had to make public the remuneration of senior managers, editorial departments and journalistic publications.

President of the Chamber of Deputies

In March 2018, he was re-elected in the constituency of Napoli–Fuorigrotta with 57.6% of votes. On 24 March 2018, Fico was elected President of the Chamber of Deputies, supported by his own party, the League, Forza Italia and Brothers of Italy.

On 23 April 2018, after the failure of the mandate to President of the Senate, Elisabetta Casellati, to start a government between the M5S and the centre-right coalition, he was given an exploratory mandate by President Sergio Mattarella to try and reconcile the issues between the Five Star Movement and the Democratic Party, in order to break the post-election political deadlock and form a fully functional new government.

His first year as President was characterized by a strong opposition to the policies promoted by Interior Minister Matteo Salvini, which were particularly severe on immigration and security.

Political views
Fico often stated he was in favor of extending the right to marriage and adoption by same-sex couples. He also supports euthanasia for terminally ill person, and the so-called jus soli, that is the right of anyone born in the territory of a state to nationality or citizenship. Fico is considered the leader of the left-wing faction of the Five Star Movement, often in opposition to Luigi Di Maio.

Electoral history

First-past-the-post elections

References

External links

  
  
  Official website on Facebook

1974 births
Living people
Politicians from Naples
University of Trieste alumni
Five Star Movement politicians
Deputies of Legislature XVII of Italy
Deputies of Legislature XVIII of Italy
Presidents of the Chamber of Deputies (Italy)
21st-century Italian politicians